Rasul Akram Scientific Centre ( – Marḵazāmūzash ʿAlmī Kārbardy Rasūl Āḵram) is a village and scientific centre in Rudbar Rural District, in the Central District of Damghan County, Semnan Province, Iran. At the 2006 census, its population was 12, in 4 families.

References 

Populated places in Damghan County